Andrei Rogozine (born 29 January 1993) is a Canadian former competitive figure skater. He is the 2011 World Junior champion, 2010 JGP Final bronze medallist, and 2013 Canadian national bronze medallist.

Personal life 
Andrei Rogozine was born January 29, 1993, in Moscow, Russia. His family moved to Canada when he was five. He attended Richmond Green Secondary School in Richmond Hill, Ontario. He moved to Newmarket, Ontario, in 2011 and now lives in Ottawa.

Career 
Rogozine started skating when he was six years old, instructed by Inga Zusev. He began learning at the Forest Hill Skating Club. He was inspired by Alexei Yagudin, the 2002 Olympic champion.

Rogozine debuted on the ISU Junior Grand Prix in the 2007–08 season. Andrei Berezintsev joined Zusev as his coach around 2009.

Rogozine won his first international medal, gold, at the 2010 JGP in Courchevel, France. After winning his other JGP assignment, in Japan, he qualified for the JGP Final in Beijing, where he was awarded the bronze. In March 2011, he competed at the World Junior Championships in Gangneung, South Korea. Ranked third in the short program and second in the free, Rogozine finished first overall with a 3.15 point margin over the silver medallist, Keiji Tanaka of Japan. He was the first Canadian in 33 years to win the World Junior men's title.

Rogozine made his Grand Prix debut in the 2011–12 season. He was a co-recipient of an Elvis Stojko bursary.

Rogozine was coached by Zusev and Berezintsev at the Richmond Training Centre in Richmond Hill, Ontario, until 2014. He then moved to Colorado Springs, Colorado, to train with Tom Zakrajsek. He represented the Nepean Skating Club.

After retiring from competition on July 28, 2016, Rogozine began performing in ice shows on cruise ships.

Programs

Competitive highlights 
GP: Grand Prix; CS: Challenger Series; JGP: Junior Grand Prix

References

External links 

 

Canadian male single skaters
Canadian people of Russian descent
1993 births
Sportspeople from Richmond Hill, Ontario
Living people
Figure skaters from Moscow
Russian emigrants to Canada
World Junior Figure Skating Championships medalists